Russian Labour Front (RTF), formerly Russian United Labour Front (ROT FRONT) is a communist party in Russia. It was formed by Left Front, Russian Communist Workers' Party and several unions on 4 December 2012.
On 27 February 2020 at the request Law "about political parties", the Supreme Court of Russia liquidated the party on the claim of the Ministry of Justice for insufficient participation in regional elections for 7 years.

2022 split
In 2022, the organization split. On 20 March 2022, the RCWP headquarters in St. Petersburg hosted a conference "Za Pobedu! (For the Victory!)" in support of the Russian invasion of Ukraine, which was also attended by The Other Russia of E. V. Limonov and Vladimir Kvachkov. The attempt of Viktor Tyulkin and Stepan Malentsov to cooperate with the National Bolsheviks caused contradictions: some of the party members took a completely anti-war position, in contrast to the intermediate position of the leadership of the RCWP. In addition, there were contradictions on the issue of participation in the elections: if the RCWP was in favor of participation and planned to re-register the Front's companies, then the supporters of  opposed any participation in the elections. Alexander Batov and his supporters were expelled from the RCWP, some members of the Moscow and Novosibirsk branches left the party. On July 1, 2022, the organization was rebranded: the word "united" was removed from the name, the abbreviated name was changed from "ROT FRONT" to "RTF", the design of the website was changed, where the blue color began to prevail, not red, communist symbols were removed from the organization's symbols. In turn, the RKRP does not recognize the split, plans to recreate the ROT FRONT together with the United Communist Party.

See also
Communist Party of Social Justice
Communist Party of the Russian Federation
Communists of Russia
Left Front (Russia)
Russian Communist Workers' Party of the Communist Party of the Soviet Union
Russian Socialist Movement

References

2012 establishments in Russia
Communist parties in Russia
Far-left politics in Russia
Formerly registered political parties in Russia
Labour parties
Political parties established in 2012
Political parties established in 2022

Political organizations based in Russia